Simon August, Count of Lippe (12 June 1727 – 1 May 1782), ruled the Principality of Lippe-Detmold from 1734 until 1782.

He was born in Detmold, the son of Simon Henry Adolph and Johanna Wilhelmine of Nassau-Idstein.  Simon August ruled until 1747 under the guardianship of his mother.  Under the influence of the Enlightenment, he issued a fiscal and social legislation and in 1749 he introduced, together with Adolf von Hillensberg, a budget in Lippe, so as to not spend money when no revenues were available.  The Sparkasse Detmold and a fire insurance company are direct continuations of companies he founded.  He acquired a salt mine at Bad Salzuflen and built a spa in Bad Meinberg.  In 1775, he created a relief fund for the poor.  A census in 1776 revealed that his country had  inhabitants.

Marriages and Issue
In Kirchheimbolanden on 24 August 1750, Simon August married firstly with princess Polyxena Louise (Kirchheimbolanden, 27 January 1733 – Detmold, 27 September 1764), daughter of Charles August, Prince of Nassau-Weilburg. They had a daughter:

Wilhelmine Caroline (Kirchheimbolanden, 6 July 1751 – Kirchheimbolanden, 4 April 1753).

In Dessau on 28 September 1765 Simon August married secondly with princess Maria Leopoldine of Anhalt-Dessau (Dessau, 18 November 1746 – Detmold, 15 April 1769). They had a son:

Frederick Wilhelm Leopold I (Detmold, 2 December 1767 – Detmold, 4 April 1802), Prince of Lippe.

In Dessau on 9 November 1769 Simon August married thirdly princess Casimire of Anhalt-Dessau (Dessau, 19 January 1749 – Detmold, 8 November 1778), sister of his previous wife. They had a son:

Casimir August (Detmold, 9 October 1777 – Falkenberg bei Berlin, 27 May 1809).

In Braunfels Castle on 26 March 1780 Simon August married fourthly princess Christine of Solms-Braunfels (Braunfels, 30 August 1744 – Detmold, 16 December 1823). They had no children

After his death at Detmold in 1782, his son Leopold I took up government.

References 
 Lore Blanke: Simon August. In: Neue Deutsche Biographie (NDB). Band 24, Duncker & Humblot, Berlín 2010, p. 425 f.

House of Lippe
Counts of Lippe
1727 births
1782 deaths
18th-century German people
People from Detmold